Polyphagozerra reticulata is a moth in the family Cossidae. It was described by James John Joicey and George Talbot in 1916. It is found on New Guinea and the Moluccas.

References

Zeuzerinae
Moths described in 1916